Tien Chia-chen (born December 20, 1983) is a Taiwanese female sport shooter. At the 2012 Summer Olympics, she competed in the Women's 10 metre air pistol, finishing in 27th, and the women's 25 metre pistol, finishing 16th. She came in second place in the women's 10 metre air pistol at the 2016 Asian Olympic Shooting Qualifying Tournament.

References

Taiwanese female sport shooters
Living people
Olympic shooters of Taiwan
Shooters at the 2012 Summer Olympics
Asian Games medalists in shooting
Shooters at the 2010 Asian Games
Shooters at the 2014 Asian Games
1983 births
Asian Games silver medalists for Chinese Taipei
Medalists at the 2014 Asian Games
Shooters at the 2018 Asian Games
Shooters at the 2020 Summer Olympics